Muhammad Yousaf Shahwani is a Pakistani politician who was a Member of the Provincial Assembly of Sindh, from May 2013 to May 2018.

Early life and education
He was born on 12 January 1971 in Quetta, and has a degree of Bachelor of Arts.

Political career
He was elected to the Provincial Assembly of Sindh as a candidate for the Mutahida Quami Movement from Constituency PS-90 KARACHI-II in the 2013 Pakistani general election.

References

Living people
Sindh MPAs 2013–2018
1971 births
Muttahida Qaumi Movement politicians